The Critical Path Project (stylized CRITICAL///PATH) is a video archive of interviews with video game designers and developers.

Launched on July 23, 2012, Critical Path contains over 1,000 videos of interviews with over 100 developers, conducted between 2010 and the present.  According to director David Grabias, the project's goals include:

To provide a documentary-based venue for critical discussion about the art of making video games.
To provide developers with a place where they can come for inspiration.
To provide players with insight into their game experience.
To make gamers aware of the great minds behind the great games.
To document the current state of game development for future generations.

Topics covered in the interviews include violence in games, methods of storytelling, game mechanics, player interaction, psychology behind playing games, commercialism in the industry, and the future of video games, among others.

All clips on the site are available for free viewing online, and there are plans to release a full-length documentary in the future.

Interview Subjects
The site currently features video clips with interviews from the following notable developers, among others:

Ernest Adams
Brian Allgeier
Stig Asmussen
Chris Avellone
Daniel Benmergui
Cliff Bleszinski
Ian Bogost
Nolan Bushnell
David Cage
John Carmack
Jenova Chen and Kellee Santiago
Brendon Chung
Michael Condrey
N'Gai Croal
Don Daglow
Patrice Désilets
Denis Dyack
Noah Falstein
Josef Fares
Tracy Fullerton
Toby Gard
Richard Garriott
Steve Gaynor
Ron Gilbert
Auriea Harvey
Trip Hawkins
Chris Hecker
David Helgason
Richard Hilleman
Clint Hocking
Todd Howard
Rod Humble
Robin Hunicke
Kenji Inafune
Toru Iwatani
Marcin Iwinski
Daniel James
David Jones
Hideo Kojima
Raph Koster
Frank Lantz
Ken Levine
Laralyn McWilliams
Jordan Mechner
Sid Meier
Peter Molyneux
Ray Muzyka and Greg Zeschuk
Frank O'Connor
Yoshinori Ono
Rob Pardo
Randy Pitchford
Rhianna Pratchett
Zoë Quinn
Amir Rao
Siobhan Reddy
Warren Robinett
Jason Rohrer
Tim Schafer
Jesse Schell
Glen Schofield
Harvey Smith
Warren Spector
Joseph Staten
Davey Wreden
Will Wright
Brianna Wu
Vince Zampella
Eric Zimmerman

Discussion
A few quotes from the site have raised discussions between critics and fans alike. For example, Metal Gear Solid Director Hideo Kojima (famous for his cinematic narrative scenes) mentions that he's "not trying to tell a story."  Sid Meier says he's "failed as a designer" when players use cheats, causing some stir with gamers when they discovered an all-powerful Sid Meier character in the latest Firaxis release, X-COM: Enemy Unknown.

The archive presents a variety of differing opinions from developers. For example, Cliff Bleszinski speaks about creating empowerment fantasies for players, while Warren Spector condemns the practice.  Sid Meier says that "micromanagement is not fun" and other developers, like Fable's Peter Molyneux, Ultima's Richard Garriott, and others attempt to create games that give the player as much freedom and decision-making as possible.

References

External links

History of video games